WMZ can refer to:
Compressed Enhanced Metafile, a file format related to Windows Metafile
US Dollar-equivalent Webmoney